West Dana is an extinct town in Helt Township, Vermillion County, in the U.S. state of Indiana. The site is near the Illinois and Indiana border.

Even though the community no longer exists, it is still cited by the USGS.

Geography

References

Former populated places in Vermillion County, Indiana
Former populated places in Indiana